Cumberland Mall is a shopping mall located in Vineland, New Jersey, located on Route 47 (Delsea Drive) at Route 55 (exit 27).

Its anchor stores are Boscov's, and Dick's Sporting Goods occupying the former JCPenney. Other tenants in the mall include Marshalls, Michaels, Bed Bath & Beyond, Old Navy, and HomeGoods.

History
The mall was built in 1973 by Rubin Organization. Its original anchor stores were Bradlees, Gaudio's, Pathmark, and Wilmington Dry Goods. Gaudio's became JCPenney, Pathmark became Toys "R" Us, and Wilmington Dry Goods became Value City. Despite the addition of these anchor stores, the mall's occupancy declined in the 1990s. A mall-wide renovation at the end of the decade added Boscov's and expanded JCPenney while reconfiguring the main mall concourse. The former Bradlees was subdivided, and The Home Depot and Regal Cinemas were added on outparcels in 1998.

In 2003, BJ's Wholesale Club opened in the mall's surrounding area, followed by Best Buy in 2006. After Value City went out of business in 2009, its space became Burlington Coat Factory.

In January 2015, it was announced the JCPenney store was closing as part of a plan to close 39 underperforming stores nationwide.

In 2018 it was announced that the Bed Bath and Beyond store, which had been a tenant at the mall since 2002, was going to close due to leasing issues.

In 2021, Burlington, the former Value City, went out of business. The vacant department store is leased by Power Warehouse which is a distribution center that handles outgoing orders for businesses inside of the mall, as well as outside. 

In November 2022, Pennsylvania Real Estate Investment Trust (PREIT) sold Cumberland Mall to Kohan Retail Investment Group.

Anchors
Boscov's (opened 1997)
Dick's Sporting Goods (opened 2016)
Marshalls 
Michaels
HomeGoods

Former Anchors
Bradlees (original anchor) 1973-circa 2001
Gaudio's (original anchor) 1973-1989?
Wilmington Dry Foods (original anchor) 1973-1989
JCPenney (former Gaudio's) 1989?-2015
Value City (former Wilmington Dry Foods) 1989-2008
Burlington Coat Factory (former Value City) 2009-2021

References

External links 
 Cumberland Mall website
 PREIT Leasing Plans

Shopping malls in New Jersey
Shopping malls established in 1973
Buildings and structures in Cumberland County, New Jersey
Tourist attractions in Cumberland County, New Jersey
Kohan Retail Investment Group
Vineland, New Jersey
1973 establishments in New Jersey